Bernard Maurice Whittington is a former American football defensive end who played nine years in the National Football League.

1971 births
Living people
American football defensive linemen
Indiana Hoosiers football players
Indianapolis Colts players
Cincinnati Bengals players
Players of American football from St. Louis
Ed Block Courage Award recipients